Dayr Ayyub was a Palestinian Arab village in the Ramle Subdistrict. It was depopulated during the 1947–48 Civil War in Mandatory Palestine on March 6, 1948 by the Givati and Sheva' brigades of Operation Nachshon. It was located 17.5 km southeast of Ramla, situated close to Bab al-Wad. On attack, the village was defended by the Jordanian Army but was mostly destroyed with the exception of a few houses and the village cemetery.

History
To the northwest of the village site is an area which, according to village belief, contained the tomb of the prophet Ayyub, the Biblical Job.  Archaeological remains, which attest to major agricultural activity have been found, dating from the Late  Hellenistic and the beginning of the Early Roman periods (first century BCE–first century CE).

Ottoman era
A census by the Ottomans in 1596 registered the village as belonging to the nahiya (subdistrict) of Ramla, part of Gaza Sanjak, and with a recorded population of 17 Muslim households, an estimated 94 persons.  The villagers paid a fixed tax rate of 25% on agricultural products, including wheat, barley, and fruits, as well as on other types of produce and property, such as goats, beehives, and vineyards, in addition to occasional revenues; a total of 4,400 akçe. 1/12 of the revenue went to a Waqf.

In 1838, it was noted as a Muslim village,  Deir Eyub, in the Ibn Humar area in the District of Er-Ramleh.

Victor Guérin visited in 1863, while an Ottoman  village list from about 1870 found that the village had a population of 36, in a total of 9 houses, though the population count included men only.

In 1883, the PEF's Survey of Western Palestine described Dayr Ayyub as being a small hamlet situated on a hillside.

British Mandate era
In the 1922 census of Palestine conducted by the British Mandate authorities, Dayr Ayyub had a population of 215, all Muslim, increasing slightly in the 1931 census to 229, still all Muslim, in a total of 66 houses.

In 1941, the village was transferred from the Jerusalem sub-district to the Ramle sub-district.

In  the 1945 statistics, the village had a population of 320 Muslims. In the 1944/45 growing season, a total of 2,769 dunums of village land was planted in cereals; 127 dunums were irrigated or used for orchards, 10 of which were olive groves, while 26 dunams were built-up (urban) areas.

An elementary school was founded in 1947 in the village, and had an enrollment of 51 students.

1948 and aftermath
Dayr Ayyub was first attacked by the predecessors to the Israel Defense Forces on the 21 December 1947, by 25 men, according to the village mukhtar. Three houses in the village were bombed, but there were no reports of casualties. On 7 February 1948, British troops moved into the village and demolished two houses. The Palestinian newspaper Filastin quoted a British communique which said that the houses had been used to fire on Jewish convoys driving by the village.

During and following Operation Nachshon, the village changed hands several times; "The History of the Haganah" indicates that the village was occupied three times in this period.

Benny Morris writes that Dayr Ayyub was depopulated in April, 1948, after military assault by Yishuv forces, however, he also writes that  Israeli intelligence noted that the women and children of Dayr Ayyub  were sent inland in late August, 1948.

In the 1949 Armistice Agreements with Jordan, Dayr Ayyub lay in the Latrun salient no man's land. However, the Israeli forces used force to prevent the Palestinian population from re-entering their own homes and claimed the territory following the war. Despite this being a demilitarized zone according to the 1949 agreements, on November 2, 1950, three Palestinian children were shot, two fatally by IDF troops near Dayr Ayyub in the Latrun salient. Ali Muhammad Ali Alyyan (12) his sister Fakhriyeh Muhammad Ali Alyyan (10) and their cousin Khadijeh Abd al Fattah Muhammad Ali (8) all from Yalo village, "The two children [Ali and Fakhriyeh] were stood in a wadi bed and the soldiers opened fire at them. According to both [adult] witnesses only one man fired at them with a sten-gun but none of the detachment attempted to interfere".

The settlement of Mevo Choron, founded in 1970, is north of the village site; there are no Israeli settlements on village land.

The site of Dayr Ayyub lies in the Canada Park reserve. Walid Khalidi described the site in 1992: "[It] is strewn with debris, including parts of walls connected to iron rafters. The remains of houses can be seen on a high hill to the south, opposite the village. The cemetery, located on this hill, to the southeast, contains the remains of a tombstone with the inscription: "AI-Hajj Muhammad 'Ulayyan Taha, died on 14 Muharram 1355 Hijra." [Islamic calendar: equvivalent of 6 April 1936]." Large cypress, eucalyptus, carob, and fig trees dominate the site, mixed with recently planted firs. The valleys are used by Israelis for fig cultivation. A spring at the southeastern edge of the village site is surrounded by a cow pen, and the entire area is fenced in.

See also
Operation Nachshon
Canada Park

References

Bibliography

External links
Welcome To Dayr Ayyub
Dayr Ayyub,  Zochrot
Survey of Western Palestine, Map 17:    IAA, Wikimedia commons
Dayr Ayyub, from the Khalil Sakakini Cultural Center
Dayr Ayyub, Palestine Family

Arab villages depopulated during the 1948 Arab–Israeli War
District of Ramla